This list of radio awards is an index of articles that describe notable awards given to radio stations, their personnel, and the creators of content for radio. The list is organized by country.

See also

Lists of awards

References

 
Radio